Manuel Krainz (born 26 March 1992) is an Austrian football player. He plays for Salzburger AK 1914.

Club career
He made his Austrian Football First League debut for FC Blau-Weiß Linz on 21 July 2017 in a game against FC Wacker Innsbruck.

References

External links
 

1992 births
Living people
Austrian footballers
FC Blau-Weiß Linz players
2. Liga (Austria) players
Austrian Regionalliga players
Association football midfielders